Geng Hongbin (born February 15, 1982, in Jingdezhen, Jiangxi) is Chinese sports shooter who competed in the 2004 Summer Olympics. During the games he finished eleventh in the men's 10 metre running target competition.

External links

External links
 
 
 

1982 births
Living people
Chinese male sport shooters
Olympic shooters of China
Shooters at the 2004 Summer Olympics
People from Jingdezhen
Running target shooters
Sport shooters from Jiangxi
21st-century Chinese people